Novosphingobium acidiphilum  is a Gram-negative, rod-shaped, acidophilic, non-spore-forming and motile bacterium from the genus of Novosphingobium which has been isolated from the subsurface water of the lake Grosse Fuchskuhle in Brandenburg in Germany.

References

Further reading

External links
Type strain of Novosphingobium acidiphilum at BacDive -  the Bacterial Diversity Metadatabase

Acidophiles
Bacteria described in 2009
Sphingomonadales